The 2022–23 season was the 80th season in the history of Tatabánya KC (known as MOL Tatabánya KC for sponsorship reasons)  and their 21st consecutive season in the top flight. The club will participate in Nemzeti Bajnokság I and the Magyar Kupa.

Players

Squad information
Squad for the 2022–23 season. 

Goalkeepers
1  Benedek Nagy
 12  Márton Székely 
 16  Martin Perényi
Left Wingers
 15  Cristian Ugalde
 33  Olivér Edwards 
Right Wingers
 14  Bence Hornyák 
 26   Pedro Rodríguez Álvarez
Line Players 
 11   Petar Topic
 19  Kolen Krancz
 23   Uroš Vilovski

Left Backs
 10  Nemanja Obradović
 17  Andrej Pergel
 24  Márk Bodor
Central Backs
8  Dávid Ubornyák
9  Josip Perić
 22  Mátyás Győri
 44  Ádám Bodnár
Right Backs
2  Mateo Maraš
 27  Gábor Ancsin (c)

Transfers
Source: Rajt a K&H férfi ligában

 IN
  Benedek Nagy (loan from  Veszprém)
  Nemanja Obradović (from  Eurofarm Pelister)
  Andrej Pergel (loan from  Veszprém)
   Pedro Rodríguez Álvarez (from  Balatonfüred)
  Márton Székely (from  Eurofarm Pelister)
  Josip Perić (from  Eurofarm Pelister)
  Mateo Maraš (from  Eurofarm Pelister)
   Petar Topic (from  Balatonfüred)
  Dávid Ubornyák (from  Gyöngyös)
  Cristian Ugalde (from  AEK Athens)
   Uroš Vilovski (from  Gyöngyös)
 Head coach:  Csaba Tombor (from  Veszprém KKFT)

 OUT
  Bence Bálint (to  Dabas)
  Zsolt Balogh (to  Ferencváros)
  László Bartucz (to  Gyöngyös)
  Nándor Bognár (to  Dabas)
  Dávid Fekete (?)
  Viorel Fotache (to  Minaur Baia Mare)
  Péter Hornyák (to  Balatonfüred)
  Ádám Juhász (to  Benfica)
  Lukáš Urban (to  Tatran Prešov)
  Darko Stojnić (?)
   Stefan Sunajko (to  Dinamo Pančevo)
  Aliaksei Ushal (to  Bacău)
  Piotr Wyszomirski (to  Górnik Zabrze)
  Bence Zdolik (to  Dabas)
  Barnabás Tóth (to  Tatai AC)
 Head coach:  Dragan Đukić

Staff members
Source: Team - Csapat MOL Tatabánya KC / 2022-2023

 Head Coach: Csaba Tombor
 Assistant Coach: Jakab Sibalin
 Goalkeeping Coach:  Haris Porobić
 Fitness Coach: László Elek
 Physiotherapist: Róbert Radnai
 Club Doctor: Zoltán Csőkör MD
 Masseur: Jenő Flasch, Gyula Kovács, Mónika Kemény

Club

Management
Source: Management (Klub / Munkatársak)

Uniform
Supplier: Jako
Shirt sponsor (front): MOL / tippmix / Grundfos
Shirt sponsor (back): Grundfos / City of Tatabánya
Shirt sponsor (sleeves): Foxconn

Pre-season

Friendly matches

Competitions
Times up to 30 October 2022 and from 26 March 2023 are CEST (UTC+2). Times from 30 October 2022 to 26 March 2023 are CET (UTC+1).

Overview

Nemzeti Bajnokság I

Regular season

Results by round

Matches
The league fixtures were announced on 5 July 2022.

Results overview

Magyar Kupa

Tatabánya entered the tournament in the fourth round.

Statistics

Top scorers
Includes all competitive matches. The list is sorted by shirt number when total goals are equal. Last updated on 18 September 2022.

Attendances
The Home hall: Multifunkcionális Sportcsarnok

List of the home matches:

References

External links
 

 
Tatabánya KC